Esta historia me suena (English title: It Rings a Bell) is a Mexican anthology television series produced by Genoveva Martínez for Televisa, that premiered on Las Estrellas on 13 May 2019. The series stars María José and Jan Carlo Bautista. The series tackles intense current issues, with song titles inspiring an episode storyline.

The series has been renewed for a fifth season, that premiered on 13 June 2022.

Premise 
Each stand-alone episode addresses family and youth issues in a familiar and optimistic tone and features a song that inspires the episode’s storyline. The storyline leads to reflection between parents and children and how to resolve them in everyday life. The song accompanies and supports that story. Most episodes feature a flash mob that highlights the featured song.

Production 
Filming of the series began on 15 October 2018. The series was originally scheduled to premiere on 12 November 2018, however it was delayed because of problems with the rights of some songs used in the episodes.

Episodes

Reception 
The series premiered with a total of 2.5 million viewers. The first ten episodes aired weekdays at 6:30pm. Due to discreet audience data, on 27 May 2019 the rest of the first season moved to the 5:30pm timeslot.

Ratings 
 

| timeslot2         = MonFri 6:30pm
| timeslot_length2  = 4
| link2             = #Episodes
| episodes2         = 12
| start2            = 
| end2              = 
| startrating2      = 2.4
| endrating2        = 2.2
| viewers2          = |2}} 

| link3             = #Episodes
| episodes3         = 38
| start3            = 
| end3              = 
| startrating3      = 3.0
| endrating3        = 2.8
| viewers3          = |2}} 

| link4             = #Episodes
| episodes4         = 30
| start4            = 
| end4              = 
| startrating4      = 2.5
| endrating4        = 2.7
| viewers4          = |2}} 

| link5             = #Episodes
| episodes5         = 25
| start5            = 
| end5              = 
| startrating5      = 2.4
| endrating5        = 2.3
| viewers5          = |2}} 
}}
Notes

Awards and nominations

References

External links 
 
 

Las Estrellas original programming
Television series by Televisa
Mexican anthology television series
Spanish-language television shows
2019 Mexican television series debuts
2010s LGBT-related drama television series
Mexican LGBT-related television shows